Gracehill is a village in County Antrim, Northern Ireland. It lies about 3 km from Ballymena and is in the townland of Ballykennedy (from ). It is part of the Borough of Mid & East Antrim.

History 
The town now known as Gracehill was originally a plot of land in the Ballyykennedy townland that was ruled by Lord O'Neil. Gracehill was established as a Moravian planned settlement in 1746 by Reverend John Cenwick.  It is due to this strong historical background that the county council and the Gracehill Old School Trust have been rallying to have it recognised as Northern Ireland's second World Heritage Site for the last 18 years. If approved this would see the town ranked alongside The Giant's Causeway.

Lord O'Neil agreed to lease about 200 plantation acres of land to Reverend John Cenwick which was divided into smaller portions among the Moravian settlers (otherwise known as the Brethren). The Moravian settlers were German-speaking Protestants. The building of Gracehill began on April 26, 1763. The Reverend John Cenwick had received much push-back in attempting to start building the settlement from the original tenants that Lord O'Neill had removed from the site. O'Neill had only given these tenants 12 months' notice to leave with no compensation for the loss of their lands. However, this push-back eventually ended and the first building to be created in Gracehill town was the Brethren's shop which the town creators thought was vital to the economic and overall prosperity of the town. This building was able to press forward as the Moravian town creators requested to borrow £2000 from the Moravian Directory which they received within 6 months of asking.

In the year 1837, the village was a great success. The plan of the city was in a quadrangle shape and built outwards from the middle. The village consisted of 39 family residents who were all Moravian church members, most of which resided in small cottages. Each resident had sufficient land surrounding their property to grow potatoes and keep a farm animal. The village was decorated with shrubbery and bushes throughout with any new buildings created for specific religious purposes including two principal houses for unmarried brethren and sisters. The principal house for unmarried brethren was also used as a daily school for young boys and girls, including those who were not residents of Gracehill, and a boarding school for young gentlemen. The village also contained a small linen manufacturer to sustain itself.

Education
Gracehill Primary School 
The old Greacehill school building dates back to 1765. It offered classes to young children in the 19th century, including those who did not reside in the village This building was still holding classes until the year 1999. The original building, a long two-storey 10-bay Georgian-style school, is now derelict due to dry rot and fire damage. A local Building Trust has been set up to attempt and turn this original school building into a historical centre for the town.

Sport
Galgorm Castle Golf Club - This is a 220-acre, 18 hole golf course.Galgorm Castle Golf Club

References

See also 
List of villages in Northern Ireland
List of towns in Northern Ireland

Populated places established in 1759
Villages in County Antrim
Settlements in the British Province of the Moravian Church
Planned communities in Northern Ireland